David Fisher McGowan (January 10, 1838 – September 22, 1924) was an American archer. He competed in the men's double York round at the 1904 Summer Olympics.

References

External links
 

1838 births
1924 deaths
American male archers
Olympic archers of the United States
Archers at the 1904 Summer Olympics
People from Perry County, Pennsylvania
Sportspeople from Pennsylvania